The following is a list of county roads in Taylor County, Florida.  All county roads are maintained by the county in which they reside.

This list includes only those county roads that are numbered in the statewide grid, not those with locally-assigned numbers.

County roads in Taylor County

References

FDOT Map of Taylor County
FDOT GIS data, accessed January 2014

 
County